As an overseas department and region of France, Guadeloupe has a developed telecommunication system.

Internet 
In 2019, there were 170,000 active high speed internet broadband subscriptions in Guadeloupe. 3 Internet Service Providers (ISPs) service the region: Orange Caraïbes, Mediaserv, and Outremer Telecom.

In 2019, there were 623,000 active mobile phone lines in Guadeloupe, which represents a 145% equipment rate, higher than mainland France.

Domain name 
Guadeloupe has its own domain name: .gp.

Radio 
There are 35 radio stations emitting in Guadeloupe. In 1997, there were 113,000 radio sets in the region.

Television 
There are 10 TV stations emitting in Guadeloupe using digital terrestrial television, including 4 local stations.

In 1997, there were 118,000 television sets in Guadeloupe.

See also
 Guadeloupe

References

External links 
 Interreg Caribbean
 Guadeloupe, SubmarineCableMap.com

 
Guadeloupe
Guadeloupe